This is the discography of Hong Kong actor and singer Ekin Cheng.

Note: English titles of Songs and Albums in italic indicates the name is simply a translation of the Chinese title as no official English title exists.

Composed singles

Unpublished singles

Tours

Musicals

Albums

Others

A list of collection albums of various Hong Kong singers including Ekin Cheng.

Karaoke

Featuring karaoke
A list of karaoke compilation of various Hong Kong Singers including Ekin Cheng.

Featuring MTVs
A list of music videos that Ekin Cheng starred in.

Cheng, Ekin
Pop music discographies